X Games Harley-Davidson Flat-Track racing was an event for the ESPN Summer X Games held in Austin, Texas, first held on June 4, 2015.
Flat-Track racing will return to X Games for 2016 in Austin on Thursday, June 2, 2016.

The 2015 event had a very rough track due to torrential rains, but was still very well received by the public and press

Competition Rules

The 2015 event utilized AMA Pro Flat Track GNC1 equipment rules as they apply to twin-cylinder motorcycles. Differing from standard AMA rules were the use of a motocross-style starting gate and the size of the track was considerably smaller than is usually used for the twin-cylinder motorcycles (normally reserved for use on half-mile and mile tracks).

2015 invited Athletes

 Jared Mees
 Johnny Lewis
 Brad Baker
 Sammy Halbert
 Doug Lawrence
 Jake Johnson
 Cory Texter
 Bryan Smith
 Jake Shoemaker
 Danny Eslick
 Briar Bauman
 Mikey Martin
 Stevie Bonsey
 Kyle Johnson
 Robert Pearson
 Wyatt Maguire
 Jarod Vanderkooi
 Chad Cose
 Kenny Coolbeth
 Michael Kirkness
 Brandon Robinson
 Nichole Mees
 Mikey Rush
 Shayna Texter

2015 Results

Flat-Track Final

2016 X Games Harley-Davidson Flat-Track

The 2016 event will be held at the recently constructed flat track at the Circuit of the Americas on June 2, 2016.
The X Games will be broadcast live on ESPN and streamed on WatchESPN.com.

2016 invited Athletes

 Brad Baker--#6 Harley-Davidson
 Briar Bauman--#14 Kawasaki Ninja 650R
 Stevie Bonsey--#80 Harley-Davidson
 Jeffrey Carver, Jr.--#23 Kawasaki Ninja 650R
 Dominic Colindres--#66 Yamaha FZ-07
 Kenny Coolbeth--#2 Harley-Davidson
 Chad Cose--#49 Kawasaki Ninja 650R
 Davis Fisher--#67 Harley-Davidson
 Sammy Halbert--#69 Harley-Davidson
 Jake Johnson--#5 H-D Motor Company Classic H-D Rinehart Racing Harley-Davidson
 Michael Kirkness--#87 Harley-Davidson
 Kayl Kolkman--#98 Kawasaki Ninja 650R
 Doug Lawrence--#73 Harley-Davidson
 Johnny Lewis--#10 Lloyd Brothers Motorsports LBM-DT16
 Wyatt Maguire--#16 Harley-Davidson
 Mikey Martin--#91 Harley-Davidson
 Jared Mees--#9 Rogers Racing Las Vegas H-D SDI Harley-Davidson
 Robert Pearson--#27 Harley-Davidson
 Larry Pegram--#72 Harley-Davidson
 Brandon Robinson--#44 Harley-Davidson
 Jake Shoemaker--#55 Triumph Bonneville
 Bryan Smith--#1 Kawasaki Ninja 650R
 Cory Texter--#65 Cory Texter Racing CTR Kawasaki Ninja 650R
 Jarod Vanderkooi--#20 Kawasaki Ninja 650R
 Henry Wiles--#17 Kawasaki Ninja 650R

2016 Results

Flat-Track Final

2017 X Games Harley-Davidson Flat-Track

The 2017 event will be held in Minnesota Circuit of the Americas on June 2, 2016.
The X Games will be broadcast live on ESPN and streamed on WatchESPN.com.

2017 invited Athletes

 Brad Baker--#6 Harley-Davidson
 Briar Bauman--#14 Kawasaki Ninja 650R
 Stevie Bonsey--#80 Harley-Davidson
 Jeffrey Carver, Jr.--#23 Kawasaki Ninja 650R
 Dominic Colindres--#66 Yamaha FZ-07
 Kenny Coolbeth--#2 Harley-Davidson
 Chad Cose--#49 Kawasaki Ninja 650R
 Davis Fisher--#67 Harley-Davidson
 Sammy Halbert--#69 Harley-Davidson
 Jake Johnson--#5 H-D Motor Company Classic H-D Rinehart Racing Harley-Davidson
 Michael Kirkness--#87 Harley-Davidson
 Kayl Kolkman--#98 Kawasaki Ninja 650R
 Doug Lawrence--#73 Harley-Davidson
 Johnny Lewis--#10 Lloyd Brothers Motorsports LBM-DT16
 Wyatt Maguire--#16 Harley-Davidson
 Mikey Martin--#91 Harley-Davidson
 Jared Mees--#9 Rogers Racing Las Vegas H-D SDI Harley-Davidson
 Robert Pearson--#27 Harley-Davidson
 Larry Pegram--#72 Harley-Davidson
 Brandon Robinson--#44 Harley-Davidson
 Jake Shoemaker--#55 Triumph Bonneville
 Bryan Smith--#1 Kawasaki Ninja 650R
 Cory Texter--#65 Cory Texter Racing CTR Kawasaki Ninja 650R
 Jarod Vanderkooi--#20 Kawasaki Ninja 650R
 Henry Wiles--#17 Kawasaki Ninja 650R

2017 Results

Flat-Track Final

References

Motorcycle races